Hendee is a surname. Notable people with the surname include:

 Barb Hendee, author
 George M. Hendee (1866–1943), co-founder of the Indian  Manufacturing Company in Springfield, Massachusetts, USA
 George Whitman Hendee (1832–1906), U.S. politician, former Governor of Vermont, former U.S. Representative from Vermont
 J. C. Hendee, author
 Kirby Hendee (1923–2016), American politician and lawyer